Alain Gilles (5 May 1945 – 18 November 2014) was a French professional basketball player and coach. Standing at 1.88 m (6' 2") tall, Gilles played at the point guard and shooting guard positions.

His number 4 jersey was retired by ASVEL, and the club's logo was also designed in his honor. In 1991, Gilles was included in the FIBA's 50 Greatest Players list. The Alain Gilles Trophy (The Best French Player award) is named after him, in his honor. He was named The Best French Basketball Player of the 20th Century, by a panel of players, coaches, and journalists. He was nicknamed "Monsieur Basket" (English: "Mr. Basket").

Playing career
Gilles played with the French club Chorale Roanne (1962–1965) and the French club ASVEL Basket (1965–1986). During his pro club career, he won 8 French League championships, and 2 French Cup titles. He also won 3 French League Player of the Year awards. 

In France's top-tier level competition, Gilles scored a total of 18,502 career points. That is the 2nd most points scored in the history of the league, behind only Hervé Dubuisson's 19,013 career points scored.

National team career
Gilles played in 160 games with the senior men's French national basketball team.

Coaching career
Gilles was the head basketball coach of the French club ASVEL Basket (1980–1989) and the French club Montpellier (1990–1993). He won the French League championship in 1981, and the French Cup title in 1984.

References

External links
FIBA Profile (archive)
FRANCE MOURNS PASSING OF ALAIN GILLES

1945 births
2014 deaths
ASVEL Basket coaches
ASVEL Basket players
French basketball coaches
French men's basketball players
1963 FIBA World Championship players
Sportspeople from Roanne
Point guards
Shooting guards